Salt Creek Township may refer to:

Illinois
 Salt Creek Township, Mason County, Illinois

Indiana
 Salt Creek Township, Decatur County, Indiana
 Salt Creek Township, Franklin County, Indiana
 Salt Creek Township, Jackson County, Indiana
 Salt Creek Township, Monroe County, Indiana

Iowa
 Salt Creek Township, Davis County, Iowa
 Salt Creek Township, Tama County, Iowa

Kansas
 Salt Creek Township, Chautauqua County, Kansas
 Salt Creek Township, Lincoln County, Kansas, in Lincoln County, Kansas
 Salt Creek Township, Mitchell County, Kansas, in Mitchell County, Kansas
 Salt Creek Township, Reno County, Kansas, in Reno County, Kansas

Missouri
 Salt Creek Township, Chariton County, Missouri

Ohio
 Salt Creek Township, Hocking County, Ohio
 Salt Creek Township, Holmes County, Ohio
 Salt Creek Township, Muskingum County, Ohio
 Salt Creek Township, Pickaway County, Ohio
 Salt Creek Township, Wayne County, Ohio

Township name disambiguation pages